In heraldry, variations of the field are any of a number of ways that a field (or a charge) may be covered with a pattern, rather than a flat tincture or a simple division of the field.

Blazoning of French adjectives

Variations of the field present a particular problem concerning consistent spelling of adjectival endings in English blazons. Because heraldry developed at a time when English clerks wrote in Anglo-Norman French, many terms in English heraldry are of French origin, as is the practice of placing most adjectives after nouns rather than before. A problem arises as to acceptable spellings of French words used in English blazons, especially in the case of adjectival endings, determined in normal French usage by gender and number. It is considered by some heraldic authorities as pedantry to adopt strictly correct linguistic usage for English blazons:
"To describe two hands as appaumées, because the word main is feminine in French, savours somewhat of pedantry. A person may be a good armorist, and a tolerable French scholar, and still be uncertain whether an escallop-shell covered with bezants should be blazoned as bezanté or bezantée".
Cussans (1898) adopted the convention of spelling all French adjectives in the masculine singular, without regard to the gender and number of the nouns they qualify; however, as Cussans admits, the commoner convention is to spell all French adjectives in the feminine singular form, for example: a chief undée and  a saltire undée, even though the French nouns chef and sautoir are in fact masculine.

Patterning with ordinaries and subordinaries 

The diminutives of the ordinaries are frequently employed to vary the field.

Any of these patterns may be counterchanged by the addition of a division line; for example, barry argent and azure, counterchanged per fess or checquy Or and gules, counterchanged per chevron.

Barry, paly, bendy 

When the field is patterned with an even number of horizontal (fesswise) stripes, this is described as barry e.g. of six or eight, usually of a colour and metal specified, e.g. barry of six argent and gules (this implies that the chiefmost piece is argent).  With ten or more pieces, the field is described as barruly.
A field with narrow piles throughout, issuing from either the dexter or sinister side of the shield, is barry pily.

When the field is patterned with an even number of vertical stripes (pallets), the field is described as paly. 

When the field is patterned with a series of diagonal stripes (bendlets), running from top-left to bottom-right, the field is described as bendy. In the opposite fashion (top-right to bottom-left) it is bendy sinister (of skarpes, the diminutive in England of the bend sinister); of chevronels, chevronny.  An unusual example of bendy is one in which a metal alternates with two colours.

In modern practice the number of pieces is nearly always even.  
A shield of thirteen vertical stripes, alternating argent and gules, would not be paly of thirteen, argent and gules, but argent, six pallets gules.
One unusual design is described in part as bendy of three though, as each third is again divided, the effect is of a six-part division.

If no number of pieces is specified, it may be left up to the heraldic artist, but is still represented with an even number.

An instance of a fess... paly Sable, Argent, Bleu celeste and Or occurs in the arms of the 158th Quartermaster Battalion of the United States Army, although this is atypical terminology and it could be argued that the fess should be blazoned as "per pale, in dexter per pale Sable and Argent, and in sinister per pale Bleu Celeste and Or".

In the modern arms of the Count of Schwarzburg, the quarters are divided by a cross bendy of three tinctures.

When the shield is divided by lines both palewise and bendwise, with the pieces coloured alternately like a chess board, this is paly-bendy; if the diagonal lines are reversed, paly-bendy sinister. If horizontal rather than vertical lines are used, it is barry-bendy; and similarly, when reversed, barry-bendy sinister.

A field which seems to be composed of a number of triangular pieces is barry bendy and bendy sinister.

Chequy 

When divided by palewise and fesswise lines into a chequered pattern, the field is chequy. The coat of arms of Croatia Chequy gules and argent is well known example of red and white chequy. The arms of "Bleichröder, banker to Bismarck," show chequy fimbriated (the chequers being divided by thin lines). The arms of the 85th Air Division (Defense) of the United States Air Force show "a checky grid" on part of the field, though this is to be distinguished from "chequy".  The number of chequers is generally indeterminate, though the fess in the arms of Robert Stewart, Lord of Lorn, they are blazoned as being "of four tracts" (in four horizontal rows); and in arms of Toledo, fifteen chequers are specified. The number of vertical rows can also be specified. When a bend or bend sinister, or one of their diminutives, is chequy, the chequers follow the direction of the bend unless otherwise specified. James Parker cites the French term equipolle to mean chequy of nine, though mentions that this is identical to a cross quarter-pierced (strangely, this is blazoned as "a Latin square chequy of nine" in the arms of the Statistical Society of Canada).  He also gives the arms of Prospect as an unusual example of chequy, Chequy in perspective argent and sable; which must be distinguished from cubes as a charge. Chequy is not "fanciable"; that is, the lines of chequy cannot be modified by lines of partition.

Lozengy, fusilly, masculy and rustré 

When the shield is divided by both bendwise and bendwise-sinister lines, creating a field of lozenges coloured like a chessboard, the result is lozengy.  A field lozengy must be distinguished from an ordinary such as a bend which is blazoned of one tincture and called "lozengy"; this means that the ordinary is entirely composed of lozenges, touching at their obtuse corners. Such arrangement is better blazoned as lozenges bendwise.   In paly bendy the bendwise lines are supposed to be less acute than in plain lozengy.

Part of the field of the arms of the 544th Intelligence, Surveillance and Reconnaissance Group of the United States Air Force is lozengy in perspective.

A field fusilly can be very difficult to distinguish from a field lozengy; the fusil is supposed to be proportionately narrower than the lozenge, and the bendwise and bendwise-sinister lines are therefore more steeply sloped.

A field masculy is composed entirely of mascles; that is, lozenges pierced with a lozenge shape – this creates a solid fretwork surface and is to be distinguished from a field fretty.

An extremely rare, possibly unique example of a field rustré - counterchanged rustres - occurs in Canadian heraldry in the arms of R.C. Purdy Chocolates Ltd.

Gyronny 

A shield that is divided quarterly and per saltire, forming eight triangular pieces, is gyronny. This is technically a field covered with "gyrons", a rare charge in the form of a wedge, shown individually in the well-known arms of Mortimer. Possibly the best known example is in the arms of the ancient Scottish family of Campbell: Gyronny of eight or and sable, borne most notably by the Duke of Argyll, Chief of the Clan Campbell. The first tincture in the blazon is that of the triangle in dexter chief.  Gyronny can also have a different number of pieces than eight; for example, Sir William Stokker, Lord Mayor of London, had a field gyronny of six; there may be gyronny of ten or twelve, and the arms of Clackson provide an example of gyronny of sixteen.  While the gyrons of gyronny almost invariably meet in the fess point, the exact centre of the shield, the arms of the University of Zululand are an unusual example of gyronny meeting in the nombril point, a point on the shield midway between the fess point and the base point. Gyronny can be modified by most of the lines of partition,  with exceptions such as dancetty and angled.
The canting arms of Maugiron show Gyronny of six, clearly deemed mal-gironné ("badly gyronny").

Variations of lines 
Any of the division lines composing the variations of the field above may be blazoned with most of the different line shapes; e.g. paly nebuly of six, Or and sable. One very common use of this is barry wavy azure and argent; this is often used to represent either water or a body of water in general, or the sea in particular, though there are other if less commonly used methods of representing the sea, including in a more naturalistic manner.

Semé 

When the field (or a charge) is described as semé or semy of a sub-ordinary or other charge, it is depicted as being scattered (literally "seeded") with many copies of that charge. Semé is regarded as part of the field and thus within the opening section of the blazon describing the field before the first comma. Thus: Azure semy-de-lis or not Azure,  semy-de-lis or. A charge on top would be blazoned: Azure semy-de-lis or, a bend argent.

To avoid confusion with a simple use of a large number of the same charge (e.g. Azure, fifteen fleurs-de-lis Or), the charges semé are ideally depicted cut off at the edge of the field, though in olden depictions this is often not the case. An example of this can be found in the modern Coat of arms of Denmark, which now features three lions among nine hearts, but the ancient arms depicted three leopards on a semy of hearts, the number of which varied and was not fixed at nine until 1819. There are also some exceptions to this, as in the case of some bordures blazoned "semé", which are usually depicted with a discrete number (often eight) of the charge. Thus for example the arms of Jesus College, Cambridge, which despite a blazon of "seme" are invariably depicted with either eight or ten "crowns Golde" on its bordure. A large number (usually eight) of any one charge arranged as if upon an invisible bordure is said to be in orle, an orle being a diminutive band within the bordure.

Most small charges can be depicted as semé, e.g. semé of roses, semé of estoiles, and so forth. In English heraldry, several types of small charges have special terms to refer to their state as semé:

semé of cross-crosslets: crusily
semé of fleurs-de-lis: semé-de-lis
semé of bezants: bezanté
semé of plates: platé
semé of billets: billeté
semé of annulets: annulletty
semé of sparks: étincellé;
semé of gouttes ("drops" (of liquid)): gouttée / guttée, with variants:
Guttée-de-sang (blood, gules)
Guttée-de-poix (pitch (bitumen), sable)
Guttée-d'eau (water, argent)
Guttée-de-larmes (tears, azure)
Guttée-d'olives (olives, vert)
semé of torteaux (roundels gules): tortelly

When a field semé is of a metal, the charges strewn on it must be of a colour, and vice versa, so as not to offend the rule of tincture.

In Cornish heraldry the arms granted to the Hockin family are Per fesse wavy gules and azure, in chief a lion passant gardant or beneath the feet a musket lying fesswise proper the base semy of fleurs-de-lis confusedly dispersed of the third, alluding to an incident in which the Cornish soldier Thomas Hockin caused the French to scatter.

The 1995-2002 arms of Rogaška Slatina, Slovenia show Vert, semee of disks or decreasing in size from base to chief.

The heraldic furs of the ermine family appear to be semé of the "ermine dots," but they are not counted as such. Fields semy of ermine spots are when the ermine spots are on a background other than argent.

Masoned 
 
A field or ordinary masoned shows a pattern like that of a brick or ashlar stone wall. This can be "proper" or of a named tincture.  The tincture relates to the mortar between the stones or bricks, the latter being argent: a wall of red bricks with white mortar is thus blazoned: gules masoned argent.

Honeycomb 
The town of Viļāni, Latvia, has part of its field honeycombed. Another example of this is in the arms of Fusagasugá, Cundinamarca, Colombia.

Folds 
The arms of the Special Troops Battalion of the 2nd Brigade, 1st Cavalry Division of the United States Army has the unique field Per pale Sable and Gules with stylized folds Sanguine, the sinister half of the field symbolizing a warrior's cape.

Pappellony 
 
A field pappellony (French: Papillon, "butterfly") shows a pattern like the wings of a butterfly, though this is categorised as a fur. The number of rows of pappellony are sometimes defined, such as seven in the arms of the Aleberici Family of Bologna. The ancient arms of the French Barons de Châteaubriant  were Gules papellony or. The Italian term squamoso and the French écaillé, meaning 'scaly', are similar.

Pied at random 
Used in some South-African coats, this means patterned like the markings of a bull or cow. There are other examples of South African heraldry that are more elaborately blazoned.

Tapissé of wheat 
A field tapissé of wheat is entirely covered (literally "carpeted") by an interlocking stylised pattern looking like a wheat field.

Diapering 

In English heraldry, diapering, or covering areas of flat colour with a tracery design, is not considered a variation of the field; it is not specified in blazon, being a decision of the individual artist. A coat depicted with diapering is considered the same as a coat drawn from the same blazon but depicted without diapering.

In French heraldry, diapering is sometimes explicitly blazoned.

Fretty and trellisé 

A field fretty is composed of bendlets and bendlets-sinister or "scarps", interleaved over one another to give the impression of a trellis. Although almost invariably the bendlets and scarpes are of the same tincture, there is an example in which they are of two different metals.  It is rare for the number of pieces of the fretty to be specified, though this is sometimes done in French blazon. The bendlets and bendlets sinister are very rarely anything other than straight, as in the arms of David Robert Wooten, in which they are raguly. Objects can be placed in the position of the bendlets and bendlets sinister and described as "fretty of," as in the arms of the Muine Bheag Town Commissioners: Party per fess or fretty of blackthorn branches leaved proper and ermine, a fess wavy azure.
Square fretty is similarly composed of barrulets and pallets.

Trellisé appears in the arms of Luc-Normand Tellier, where it consists of "bendlets, bendlets sinister and barrulets" interlaced.
These are not, strictly speaking, variations of the field, since they are depicted as being on the field rather than in it.

Notes

References

Bibliography

 

Heraldry
Heraldic ordinaries
Patterns